Westbourne may refer to:

Places 
Westbourne, Dorset, part of Bournemouth, England
Westbourne, London, an area west of Paddington in west London, England
 Westbourne, Manitoba, Canada
 Westbourne (Richmond, Virginia), a historic home located in Richmond, Virginia, United States
Westbourne, Suffolk, part of Ipswich, England
Westbourne, Tennessee, United States
Westbourne, West Sussex, England
 Westbourne (Chichester) (UK electoral ward)
River Westbourne, in London, England

Schools 
 Westbourne House School, near Chichester in West Sussex, England
 Westbourne School, Penarth, a school in Penarth, Wales
 Westbourne School, an independent school in Sheffield, England
 Westbourne Grammar School, a co-educational school in Melbourne, Australia

Surname 

 Britt Westbourne, fictional character

See also
 Westburn (disambiguation)